The Luton Analogue Computing Engine (LACE) was a code name for a military general purpose analogue computer, predominantly used for missile simulation.
It was developed in 1953-1956 by English Electric's Guided Missile Division in Luton, UK. Upon the closure of the Luton factory in 1962, LACE was transferred to the British Aircraft Corporation (BAC) Guided Weapons Division in Stevenage.

References

External links
 English Electric Co: Navigational Projects Division, Grace's Guide to British Industrial History

Early British computers
Analogue Computing Engine
British Aircraft Corporation
Computer-related introductions in 1953
English inventions
Science and technology in Bedfordshire
Stevenage